The Quintessence is an album by Quincy Jones and his orchestra. It was released in 1962 and was his only album for Impulse! One critic called it "the sound of the modern, progressive big band at its pinnacle."

Jones's band was an outgrowth of the orchestra used in the Broadway show  Free and Easy and featured some of the personnel that Jones assembled in New York for the show's European dates.

Contributors
The core band consists of Phil Woods, Melba Liston, Julius Watkins, and bassist Milt Hinton and pianist Patricia Bown on two sessions, with bassist Buddy Catlett and pianist Bobby Scott on another. The trumpet chairs are held alternately by players like Freddie Hubbard, Clark Terry, Thad Jones, and Snooky Young. Oliver Nelson, Frank Wess and Curtis Fuller also contributed.

Track listing
 The Quintessence (Quincy Jones) - 4:21
 Robot Portrait (Billy Byers) - 5:25
 Little Karen (Benny Golson) - 3:44
 Straight, No Chaser (Thelonious Monk) - 2:26
 For Lena and Lennie (Jones) - 4:17
 Hard Sock Dance (Jones) - 3:20
 Invitation (Bronisław Kaper, Paul Francis Webster) - 3:35
 The Twitch (Byers) - 3:50

Tracks 5, 8 recorded on November 29, 1961; #2-3, 6 on December 18; 1, 4, 7 on December 22, 1961.

Personnel
Tracks 1, 4, 7

Phil Woods, Oliver Nelson, Jerome Richardson  - saxophone
Billy Byers, Curtis Fuller, Thomas Mitchell - trombone
Ernie Royal, Snooky Young, Joe Newman, Thad Jones - trumpet
Julius Watkins, James Buffington, Earl Chapin, Ray Alonge - French horn
Harvey Phillips - tuba
Gloria Agostini - harp
Patricia Bown - piano
Milt Hinton - bass
James Johnson - drums

Tracks 2, 3, 6
Eric Dixon, Frank Wess, Phil Woods, Oliver Nelson - saxophone
Freddie Hubbard, Al Derisi, Snooky Young, Thad Jones - trumpet
Melba Liston, Billy Byers, Paul Faulise, Rodney Levitt - trombone
Julius Watkins - French horn
Patricia Bown - piano
Milt Hinton - bass
Bill English - drums

Tracks 5, 8
Phil Woods,  Eric Dixon, Jerome Richardson - saxophone
 Jerome Kail, Clyde Reasinger, Clark Terry, Joe Newman - trumpet
Billy Byers, Paul Faulise, Melba Liston  - trombone
Julius Watkins - French horn
Bobby Scott - piano
George Catlett - bass
Stu Martin - drums

Production
Bob Thiele - producer
Frank Abbey - engineer
Pete Turner - cover photograph

References

See also
Quincy Jones discography

Quincy Jones albums
Albums arranged by Quincy Jones
Albums produced by Bob Thiele
1962 albums
Impulse! Records albums